West Wykeham is a deserted medieval village in East Lindsey, Lincolnshire, England.

West Wykeham is recorded in documents of 1334. The village was impoverished by the end of the 14th century.

References

Deserted medieval villages in Lincolnshire
Archaeological sites in Lincolnshire